(born 10 March 1963) is a former female track and field athlete from Japan, who competed for her native country in the women's discus throw event.

International competitions

References

1963 births
Living people
Japanese female discus throwers
Asian Games medalists in athletics (track and field)
Athletes (track and field) at the 1990 Asian Games
Athletes (track and field) at the 1994 Asian Games
Asian Games silver medalists for Japan
Asian Games bronze medalists for Japan
Medalists at the 1990 Asian Games
Medalists at the 1994 Asian Games
Japan Championships in Athletics winners
20th-century Japanese women